Albanian Supercup 2012 is the 19th edition of the Albanian Supercup since its establishment in 1989. The match was contested between the 2011–12 Albanian Cup winners KF Tirana and the 2011–12 Albanian Superliga champions Skënderbeu Korçë.

Details

See also
 2011–12 Albanian Superliga
 2011–12 Albanian Cup

References

2010
Supercup
Albanian Supercup, 2012
Albanian Supercup, 2012